Spirit of Tasmania V is a roll-on/roll-off ferry, under construction by Rauma Marine Constructions at its shipyards in Rauma, Finland. It is to be operated by Spirit of Tasmania in Australia on the Bass Strait ferry route between Geelong, Victoria and Devonport, Tasmania.

In April 2021 Rauma Marine Constructions signed a contract with Spirit of Tasmania for the construction of two ships, the Spirit of Tasmania IV and Spirit of Tasmania V. Construction commenced on 20 December 2022 with a steel-cutting ceremony.

The two ferries will replace the Spirit of Tasmania I and Spirit of Tasmania II. It is scheduled to be delivered in the last quarter of 2024.

References 

Bass Strait ferries
Ferries of Australia
Ships built in Rauma, Finland
2024 ships